Sunfish is an unincorporated community located in the northwest corner of Edmonson County, Kentucky, United States, near the Grayson County line. It is approximately 25 miles (40 km) due north of Bowling Green.

Sunfish is part of the Bowling Green Metropolitan Statistical Area.

History 
The Sunfish community is named for Sunfish Creek, a secondary tributary of the Green River which joins Bear Creek to drain the watershed of West-Central Edmonson County. The community was established prior to the 1825 formation of Edmonson County in the section of Edmonson which was originally part of Grayson County. Many of the settlers were Revolutionary War and War of 1812 veterans and included several Catholic families.

Various independent schools existed in the community prior to the consolidation of all Edmonson County schools in 1959, and the former Sunfish High School remained open as an elementary (grades 1-8) school until 1979.

Current community activities are centered on three churches, including St. Johns Catholic Church, and some small shops. Most employment and entertainment is found in Brownsville, the county seat of Edmonson County; Leitchfield, the nearest large community, in Grayson County, and in Bowling Green about an hour drive away. Several historic cemeteries exist in the Sweeden community all in various states of preservation.

Nearby cities 
Bowling Green
Brownsville
Caneyville
Leitchfield
Morgantown

References

Unincorporated communities in Edmonson County, Kentucky
Unincorporated communities in Kentucky
Bowling Green metropolitan area, Kentucky